Barton Creek Bridge is an early example of a cable stayed bridge; it spans Barton Creek in Huckabay, Texas. Built 1890 by Runyon Bridge Company, it was bypassed and abandoned in the 1930s and now lies in ruins. The bridge was brought to the attention of the Historic American Engineering Record in 2000, when it was found to bear a striking resemblance to the Bluff Dale Suspension Bridge, which had at the time, been considered the only example of a Runyon patent cable-stayed bridge.

See also
List of bridges documented by the Historic American Engineering Record in Texas

References

External links

Bridges in Texas
Cable-stayed bridges in the United States
Historic American Engineering Record in Texas
1890 establishments in Texas